The 13th Assembly District of Wisconsin is one of 99 districts in the Wisconsin State Assembly. Located in southeast Wisconsin, the district comprises parts of western Milwaukee County and eastern Waukesha County.  It contains the city of Brookfield and the village of Elm Grove, and part of western Wauwatosa.  The district is represented by Republican Tom Michalski, since January 2023.

The 13th Assembly district is located within Wisconsin's 5th Senate district, along with the 14th and 15th Assembly districts.

History 
The district was created in the 1972 redistricting act (1971 Wisc. Act 304) which first established the numbered district system, replacing the previous system which allocated districts to specific counties.  The 13th district was drawn somewhat in line with the western half of the previous Milwaukee County 18th district, though with some city of Milwaukee wards removed, and the village of Butler in Waukesha County added.

The district has remained in the same vicinity since 1972, but the boundaries have moved further and further west.  By 2011, the district contained only a small portion of the city of Milwaukee; as of the 2022 redistricting, the district is now almost entirely contained within Waukesha County.

List of past representatives

References 

Wisconsin State Assembly districts
Milwaukee County, Wisconsin
Waukesha County, Wisconsin